Irina Viktorovna Nazarova (Bagryantseva) (born July 31, 1957 in Kaliningrad) is a Soviet athlete who competed mainly in the 400 metres. She trained in Dynamo.  She is the daughter of former Olympian, Elizabeta Bagriantseva, who won silver in the discus at the Helsinki Games in 1952.

She competed for the USSR at the 1980 Summer Olympics held in Moscow, Russian SFSR, where she won the gold medal with her teammates Tatyana Prorochenko, Tatyana Goyshchik and Nina Zyuskova in the women's 4x400 metres event.

References

Bibliography 

1957 births
Living people
Russian female sprinters
Soviet female sprinters
Dynamo sports society athletes
Olympic athletes of the Soviet Union
Athletes (track and field) at the 1980 Summer Olympics
Olympic gold medalists for the Soviet Union
Sportspeople from Kaliningrad
Medalists at the 1980 Summer Olympics
Olympic gold medalists in athletics (track and field)
Universiade medalists in athletics (track and field)
Universiade gold medalists for the Soviet Union
Medalists at the 1981 Summer Universiade
Olympic female sprinters
Friendship Games medalists in athletics